This is a list of presidents (post-1947 constitution) of the Republic of China by other offices (either elected or appointed) held. Every president of the Republic of China has served as at least one of the following:
 Vice President of the Republic of China
 an elected representative (either Legislative Yuan or National Assembly)
 a governor or mayor of a province or special municipality
 an Executive Yuan minister
 a general of the Republic of China Army

Central government

Executive branch

Vice presidents 

3 vice presidents (Lien Chan, Annette Lu, and William Lai) all made failed runs for the presidency. Lien received their party's nomination.

Executive Yuan Ministers
Italics indicate positions before promulgation of the 1947 constitution.

Legislative branch

National Assembly

Legislative Yuan

Local government

Governors and Mayors of Special Municipalities

Provincial or City Councillors

Other provincial or municipal offices

Military

Lost races

Presidential elections

Local elections

References

Republic of China
Lists of Taiwanese politicians